Red Rocket 7 is a seven-issue comic book limited series by Mike Allred, published in 1997 by Dark Horse Comics.

Collected editions
It has been collected into trade paperback, most recently with a tenth anniversary hardcover edition from Image Comics.

Awards
1998: Nominated for the "Best Limited Series" Eisner Award.

Tie-ins
Allred also released an album and a film, Astroesque, tied to the comic. They are meant to form a loose trilogy.

Notes

References

1997 comics debuts